Sayyar Ahmadabad (also Romanized as Sayyār Aḩmadābād) is a village in Hoveyzeh Rural District, in the Central District of Hoveyzeh County, Khuzestan Province, Iran. At the 2006 census, its population was 264, in 45 families.

Sayyar Ahmadabad-e Movali (also Romanized as Sayyār Aḩmadābād-e Movālī; also known as Sayyār Aḩmadābād and Sayyār-e Movālī) is nearby or identical. At the 2006 census, its population was 313, in 49 families.

References 

Populated places in Hoveyzeh County